The Doctor is a half-hour medical anthology series that aired Sunday evenings on the NBC television network from August 24, 1952, until June 28, 1953, with a total of 44 episodes. 

The format had the viewer seeing patients "through the eyes of a general practitioner who makes house calls". Hosted by Warner Anderson, the program revolved around emotional problems. Actors who appeared included Anne Jackson, Ernest Truex, Mildred Natwick, and Lee Marvin. Beulah Bondi and Charles Bronson guest-starred in the episode "The Guest" (1952).

The Doctor replaced The Red Skelton Show on Sunday nights. Its competition included The Web on CBS. The program was produced on film by Marion Parsonnet. Some of the films were made in Hollywood, and others were made in New York. When it went into syndication, it was re-titled The Visitor. Robert Aldrich directed 17 episodes, three of which he also wrote.  Rod Serling wrote two episodes.

Camay soap sponsored the program.

References

External links

1950s American anthology television series
1952 American television series debuts
1953 American television series endings
1950s American medical television series
Black-and-white American television shows
NBC original programming